Acrolophus tapuja is a species of moth of the family Acrolophidae. It is found in Colombia and southern Brazil.

Taxonomy
The species was described as a Hepialidae species.

References

External links
Hepialidae genera

Moths described in 1914
tapuja
Moths of South America